Rojos de Colima Fútbol Club is a Mexican football club that plays in the Tercera División de México. The club is based in Colima City, Colima and was founded in 2014 as Palmeros F.C.. In november 2018, the team was renamed as Rojos de Colima Fútbol Club.

See also
Football in Mexico
Tercera División de México

External links
Tercera Divicion

References 

Association football clubs established in 2014
Colima City
Football clubs in Colima
2014 establishments in Mexico